Three Days of Anarchy is a 2005 Italian drama film written and directed by Vito Zagarrio.

Plot 
The three days power vacuum in a Sicilian village shortly after the American landing in Sicily in July 1943.

Cast 

 Enrico Lo Verso as Giuseppe 
 Tiziana Lodato as Pina 
  Marica Coco as  Anna 
  Salvatore Lazzaro as  Toni 
  Gaetano Aronica as  Salvatore 
 Luigi Maria Burruano as  Don Mimì 
 Renato Carpentieri as  Don Vito Gallo 
  Rosa Pianeta as  Donna Rosa 
 Nino Frassica as  Dr. Puglisi 
  Giacinto Ferro as  Don Calò 
  David Coco as  Pasquale 
  Roberto Purvis as Joe 
 Terence Hill 
 Robert Hundar

References

External links

Italian drama films
2005 drama films
2005 films
Italian World War II films
Films directed by Vito Zagarrio
Films set in 1943
Films set in Sicily
2000s Italian films